Yumaguzhino (Yomağuja) is a rural locality (a village) and the administrative centre of Kanzafarovsky Selsoviet, Zilairsky District, Bashkortostan, Russia. The population was 380 as of 2010. There are 5 streets.

Geography 
Yumaguzhino is located 26 km east of Zilair (the district's administrative centre) by road. Novoyakupovo is the nearest rural locality.

References 

Rural localities in Zilairsky District